The 2017–18 Kategoria e Dytë was the 47th official season of the Albanian football third division since its establishment. There were 28 teams competing this season, split in 2 groups, each with 14 teams. The winners of the groups played the league's final against each other and also gained promotion to the 2018-19 Albanian First Division. The runners-up qualified to the play-off round which they played against the 9th ranked teams in the 2017-18 Kategoria e Parë. Elbasani, Oriku, Veleçiku  and Vora were promoted to the 2018-19 Kategoria e Parë. Domozdova was relegated to the 2019 Kategoria e Tretë. Vora won their first Kategoria e Dytë title after beating Elbasani in the final match.

Changes from last season

Team changes

From Kategoria e Dytë
Promoted to Kategoria e Parë:
 Egnatia
 KF Vllaznia B
 Naftëtari

To Kategoria e Dytë
Relegated from Kategoria e Parë:
 Adriatiku
 Sopoti
 KF Elbasani

Promoted from Kategoria e Tretë:
 FC Klosi
 Spartaku

Locations

Stadia by capacity and locations

Group A

Source:

Group B

Source:

League standings

Group A

Group B

Final

References

3
2017–18 in European third tier association football leagues
Kategoria e Dytë seasons